The Internet is a global system of interconnected computer networks.

Internet may also refer to:

 Internet (web browser), by Amazon
 Internet Co., Ltd., a software company based in Japan
 The Internet (band), a soul music band
 "Internets", a catchphrase to portray someone as ignorant about technology
 "Internet", a song by Post Malone from Hollywood's Bleeding
 International Project Management Association, known as INTERNET before 1996; see Association for Project Management

See also
 Internet Protocol Suite, a computer networking model
 Internetwork, any system of interconnected networks
 Private network, referred to in RFC 1918 as "private internets"
 Intranet, a computer network within an organization
 Internet2, a consortium that develops high bandwidth network applications